Gilbert Richard Mitchison, Baron Mitchison,  (23 March 1894 – 14 February 1970) was a British Labour politician.

Born in Staines, Mitchison was educated at Eton College and New College, Oxford, and became a barrister (called to the bar in 1917) and King's Counsel. He served with the Queen's Bays in the First World War, attaining the rank of Major and gaining the Croix de Guerre. He worked in the Ministry of Labour during the Second World War, on the Beveridge manpower survey, and led the Nuffield College social reconstruction survey.

Mitchison stood for Parliament without success in King's Norton at the 1931 and 1935 elections. He was the Labour Member of Parliament for Kettering between 1945 and 1964, beating the young incumbent, John Profumo, at the 1945 election. In Parliament, Mitchison sponsored the New Streets Act as a private member's bill. He was given a life peerage, created Baron Mitchison, of Carradale in the County of Argyllshire on 5 October 1964. He served on the executive of the Fabian Society.

He married the writer Naomi Haldane (daughter of John Scott Haldane and sister of J.B.S. Haldane) in Oxford 1916. They had six children, including four sons: Geoffrey (1918–1927), Denis (1919–2018, a professor of bacteriology), Murdoch (1922–2011) and Avrion (born 1928), both professors of zoology. Their daughters were Lois and Valentine, the latter of whom married the historian Mark Arnold-Forster. Mitchison died in Westminster aged 75.

References

External links 
 

1894 births
1970 deaths
2nd Dragoon Guards (Queen's Bays) officers
Alumni of New College, Oxford
British Army personnel of World War I
Commanders of the Order of the British Empire
People educated at Eton College
Labour Party (UK) MPs for English constituencies
Labour Party (UK) life peers 
Members of the Fabian Society
Ministers in the Wilson governments, 1964–1970
People from Staines-upon-Thames
Recipients of the Croix de Guerre 1914–1918 (France)
UK MPs 1945–1950
UK MPs 1950–1951
UK MPs 1951–1955
UK MPs 1955–1959
UK MPs 1959–1964
UK MPs who were granted peerages
20th-century English lawyers
Military personnel from Middlesex
Life peers created by Elizabeth II
English barristers